Boone Creek may refer to:

Waterways
 Boone Creek (Big Piney River tributary), a stream in Texas County, Missouri, United States
 Boone Creek (Bourbeuse River tributary), a stream in Crawford, Franklin, and Gasconade Counties, Missouri, United States
 Boone Creek (Idaho), a river in Idaho
 Boone Creek, North Carolina, a tributary of the South Fork New River
 Boone Creek (Illinois), a tributary of the Fox River (Illinois River tributary) in McHenry County, Illinois

Other
 Boone Creek (band), a band with members of New South (band)

See also
 Boones Creek, Tennessee, a neighborhood